Rock Music: A Tribute to Weezer is an album released by Dead Droid Records. As the album title implies, it is a series of Weezer songs covered by a wide range of bands.  The vinyl version contains two versions of "Say it Ain't So", covered by Further Seems Forever.  One with the band's original vocalist Chris Carrabba.  However, the vinyl sleeve also contains a misprint noting that the version of "Say It Ain't So" sung by Chris Carrabba is track 14 when in fact it is track 5.

Track listing

References

2002 compilation albums
Weezer tribute albums